Catherine of Cleves (or of Nevers), Countess of Eu (1548 – 11 May 1633) was the wife of Henry I, Duke of Guise and the matriarch of the powerful and influential House of Guise. By marriage, she was Duchess of Guise from 1570 to 1588, and Dowager Duchess of Guise thereafter. She was also Countess of Eu in her own right from 1564.

Biography
Catherine was the second daughter of Francis of Cleves, Duke of Nevers, and Margaret of Bourbon, the elder sister of Antoine de Bourbon. She was the first cousin of Henry III of Navarre, the sister-in-law of Henry of Bourbon, Prince of Condé, and great-aunt of Ludwika Maria Gonzaga, the queen consort of Poland.

At the age of twelve, Catherine married the 19-year-old Antoine III de Croÿ, Prince de Porcien (or Porcean), who died seven years later, leaving her a widow at the young age of 19. Because of his marriage with Catherine de Cleves, a member of the House of Nevers, the feud over Beaufort and Coulommiers began as a dispute between the Croy and Nevers families. Antoine de Croÿ was a Calvinist and demanded that his wife also adopt this faith. They had four children, all of whom died in early childhood. After the conventional three years of mourning, on 4 October 1570, Catherine married Henri de Lorraine, Duke of Guise, who was two years her junior. They had fourteen children, including Charles, Duke of Guise and Louis III, Cardinal of Guise. Catherine had a widely publicised affair with a young nobleman, Saint-Mégrin, who was killed by her husband. The event is dramatised in the Alexandre Dumas play Henri III et sa cour (1829).

Henry of Guise was the leader of the fervently Catholic faction in the French Wars of Religion. From 1584, the conflict among factions led by Henry of Guise, Henry of Navarre, and Henry III of France was known as the War of the Three Henrys.  In 1588, Henry of Guise was assassinated on the orders of King Henry III.

Catherine never forgave Henry III of France (who kept taunting her as "la maîtresse de Saint Megrin") for his part in the assassination of her husband. She took a keen interest in the intrigues of the Catholic League and encouraged Henry III's assassination in 1589. At the conclusion of the War of the Three Henrys, she was mindful of the interests of her large family and supported her son Charles as a candidate for the French throne.

Catherine's reconciliation with her cousin, Henry IV of France, was not effected until his conversion to Catholicism. She immediately moved to Paris and obtained a very honorable position in the retinue of his wife, Marie de' Medici. In 1613, Catherine interceded for her son, François Alexandre, who had killed the Baron of Luz in a duel, asking for his banishment instead of execution for murder.

The Guises continued to support the queen throughout the regency, and Catherine followed Marie into exile in Blois after Louis XIII assumed the reins of government in 1619. After returning to the Louvre, the Dowager Duchess - anxious to promote the interests of the House of Guise - resumed plotting against Cardinal Richelieu.

The death of her youngest daughter, the princesse de Conti (who had been implicated in the Day of the Dupes conspiracy), proved a blow to her spirits. She retired to her château d'Eu, where she died aged 85. She was buried at the château next to her husband's ornate tomb.

Issue 
On October 4, 1560, at the age of twelve, Catherine married the Prince of Porcien, Antoine de Croy, who died in 1567. They had four children, all of whom died in early childhood:
 Louise Marie (November 8, 1561 – December 1562).
 Jean (born and died in January 1564).
 Catherine (5 December 1564 – December 1566).
 Jeanne (May 1566 – August 1566).

Catherine remarried on October 4, 1570 in Paris to Henry I, Duke of Guise, by whom she had fourteen children, half of whom died in childhood:

 Charles, Duke of Guise (1571–1640)
 Henri (June 30, 1572, Paris – August 13, 1574), died in childhood
 Catherine (November 3, 1573), died at birth
 Louis III, Cardinal of Guise (1575–1621), Archbishop of Reims
 Charles (January 1, 1576, Paris), died at birth
 Marie (June 1, 1577 – 1582), died in childhood
 Claude, Duke of Chevreuse (1578–1657) married Marie de Rohan, daughter of Hercule de Rohan, duc de Montbazon
 Catherine (b. May 29, 1579), died in childhood
 Christine (January 21, 1580), died at birth
 François (May 14, 1581 – September 29, 1582), died in childhood
 Renée (1585 – June 13, 1626, Reims), Abbess of St. Pierre
 Jeanne (July 31, 1586 – October 8, 1638, Jouarre), Abbess of Jouarre
 Louise Marguerite, (1588 – April 30, 1631, Château d'Eu), married at the Château de Meudon on July 24, 1605 François, Prince of Conti
 François Alexandre (February 7, 1589 – June 1, 1614, Château des Baux-de-Provence), a Knight of the Order of Malta

Ancestry

Notes

References

Sources

101

House of Guise
House of Lorraine
16th-century French women
17th-century French women
French Roman Catholics
French Calvinist and Reformed Christians
People from the Duchy of Cleves
1548 births
1633 deaths
Eu, Countess of, Catherine of Cleves
Princesses of Joinville
Duchesses of Guise
Countesses of Eu
Princesses of Lorraine
House of La Marck
People of the French Wars of Religion
Household of Catherine de' Medici